Bataan Transit Co., Inc. is a provincial bus company in the Philippines plying Central and North Luzon, particularly to the provinces of Bataan and La Union.

Under the management of its parent, the Five Star Bus Company it serves routes to Bataan and La Union aside from its parent it also manages another company of the alliance, First North Luzon Transit.

History
Bataan Transit was founded in May 15, 2003 as Nichaea Tours, Inc. Its fleet has since grown to 50 buses. They first started their operations to the City of Balanga, and then later expanded to Mariveles and San Fernando City, La Union. The bus company serves as a successor to Philippine Rabbit plying to Bataan as it stopped its route going to the said province on June 2003.

Main stops 
For Bataan passengers, their main stop is either the Bataan Transit terminal at San Fernando, Pampanga, or the Travellers Former (Double Happiness) bus stop at Lubao, Pampanga.

For the inter-provincial route Mariveles-San Fernando (La Union) the main stop can also be Bataan Transit's terminal in San Fernando, Pampanga.

Fleet

Bataan Transit utilizes and maintains the following:

Hyundai Motors Korea

Hyundai Aerospace LD
Hyundai Universe Space Luxury
Hyundai Universe Space Xpress Noble
Hyundai Universe Space Luxury Classic
Hyundai Universe Space Luxury Premium
Kia Granbird Bluesky S125
Kia Granbird SD

Santarosa Motorworks

Nissan Diesel Kinglong Body XMQ6118Y
Nissan Diesel Yutong Body ZK6120 JA450SSN
Nissan Diesel Yutong Body ZK6120 RB46S
Nissan Diesel Yutong Body ZK6100HA RB46SR
Nissan Diesel Yutong ZK6100HA RB46S
Nissan Diesel Yutong ZK6120HE
Nissan Diesel Yutong ZK6107HA

Higer

Higer KLQ6128LQ (Soon to Release)

Terminals

Metro Manila 
These terminals are shared with Five Star Bus Company:
Cubao
Avenida
Monumento

Central Luzon 
Bataan
Balanga
Mariveles

Ilocos Region 
La Union
San Fernando City

Destinations

Metro Manila
Cubao, Quezon City
Avenida, Manila
Total Gas Station Balintawak, EDSA-Balintawak, Quezon City

Provincial Destinations
 NLET Terminal Bocaue, Bulacan
San Fernando, Pampanga (shared with First North Luzon Transit)
Guagua, Pampanga
Lubao, Pampanga
Orani, Bataan
Balanga (shared with First North Luzon Transit)
Mariveles, Bataan (shared with First North Luzon Transit)

Inter-Provincial Lines
Mariveles - San Fernando (La Union) via San Fernando (Pampanga)**
Mariveles - San Jose via San Fernando (Pampanga)**

Via Dau SCTEX Concepcion Exit.

Former routes
Bataan Transit served Metro Manila to Candaba, Pampanga which is now inactive.

See also 
Genesis Transport
Baliwag Transit

References

External links

Bus companies of the Philippines
Transportation in Luzon
Transportation in Bataan
Transportation in La Union
Transportation in Quezon